Marion Davies (born 12 October 1927) was a British figure skater. She competed in the ladies' singles event at the 1948 Winter Olympics.

References

External links
 

1927 births
Living people
British female single skaters
Olympic figure skaters of Great Britain
Figure skaters at the 1948 Winter Olympics
Figure skaters from Wembley